The 2019 European Cross Country Championships is the 26th edition of the European Cross Country Championships. It was held 8 December 2019, hosted by Lisbon, Portugal. It was the third occasion that Portugal has hosted the championships.

Medal summary

Results

Senior men

Senior women

U23 men

U23 women

U20 men

U20 women

References

European Cross Country Championships
European Cross Country Championships
European Cross Country Championships
European Cross Country Championships
European Cross Country Championship